Yang Bozhen (1919–1987) was a Chinese diplomat. He was Ambassador of the People's Republic of China to Sweden (1964–1969).

1919 births
1987 deaths
Ambassadors of China to Sweden